Falabella is a miniature horse breed.

It may also refer to:

Business
Falabella (retail store), a South American department store chain.
Falabella (company) a Chilean company that operates various businesses in South America

People
Débora Falabella (born 1979), Brazilian actress
Miguel Falabella (born 1956), Brazilian actor